Ardwina was the last wooden Thames barge to be built in Ipswich. This was in 1909. She was registered in London. She worked commercially until 1956. She was laid up after a collision and restored as a yacht conversion.  She is still sailing in 2018, based at St Katherine Docks, and regularly passes under Tower Bridge.

Description

History
The Ardwina sailed for many years out of Grays, working for Goldsmith's. She ran on one occasion from Grays to Calais in 10¼ hours.  On another occasion she was demasted in the channel, the crew were taken off and she was put on tow. The tow rope broke twice and she drifted in the shipping lanes for four days before she was captured and towed to harbour by a French motor coaster. Following a further accident in the Thames she was bought and converted into a barge yacht.

See also

List of active Thames sailing barges

References

Bibliography

External links

 Thames Sailing Barge Trust
 Mersea museum barge database
 Sailing Barge Association
 Society for Sailing Barge Research active barges

Ardwina
1908 ships
Individual sailing vessels
Ships built in England
Transport on the River Thames
Sailing ships of the United Kingdom
Ships and vessels on the National Register of Historic Vessels